Peodes is a genus of flies in the family Dolichopodidae, with three known species from the Palaearctic realm.

Species
The following three species are included in the genus:
 Peodes forcipatus Loew, 1857 – Austria, Czech Republic, France, Germany, Hungary, Italy, Norway, Poland, Romania, Russia (Krasnodar, Saint Petersburg, Ural), Slovakia, Sweden, Switzerland
 Peodes petsamoensis Frey, 1930 – Czech Republic, Russia (Murmansk Oblast)
 Peodes yeniseiensis Grichanov, 2012 – Russia (Krasnoyarsk Krai)

Unrecognised species:
 "Peodes" nicobarensis Schiner, 1868 – Nicobar Islands; considered a member of Sympycninae or Peloropeodinae

References

Hydrophorinae
Dolichopodidae genera
Diptera of Europe
Taxa named by Hermann Loew